Esoteric Christianity is an approach to Christianity which features "secret traditions" that require an initiation to learn or understand. The term esoteric was coined in the 17th century and derives from the Greek  ("inner").
 
These spiritual currents share some common features, such as heterodox or heretical Christian theology; the canonical gospels, various apocalyptic literature, and some New Testament apocrypha as sacred texts; and disciplina arcani, a supposed oral tradition from the Twelve Apostles containing esoteric teachings of Jesus the Christ.

Esoteric Christianity was closely related to gnosticism, and survives in a few modern churches.

History

Ancient roots 

Some modern "scholars" believe that in the early stages of proto-orthodox Christianity, a nucleus of oral teachings were inherited from Palestinian and Hellenistic Judaism. In the 4th century, it was believed to form the basis of a secret oral tradition which came to be called disciplina arcani. Mainstream theologians, however, believe that it contained only liturgical details and certain other traditions which remain a part of some branches of mainstream Christianity. Important influences on esoteric Christianity are the Christian theologians Clement of Alexandria and Origen, the leading figures of the Catechetical School of Alexandria.

Present-day denominations 
A denomination of esoteric Christianity is The Christian Community. It focuses on the experiential aspect of sacraments, with the Eucharist serving as "the Rite of the Consecration of Man".

Scholar Jan Shipps describes the Church of Jesus Christ of Latter-day Saints as having esoteric elements.

Concepts

Reincarnation 
Influenced by the Platonic doctrine of metempsychosis, reincarnation of the soul was accepted by most Gnostic Christian sects such as Valentinianism and the Basilidians, but denied by the proto-orthodox one. While hypothetically considering a complex multiple-world transmigration scheme in De Principiis, Origen denies reincarnation in his work Against Celsus and elsewhere. 

Despite this apparent contradiction, most modern esoteric Christian movements refer to Origen's writings (along with other Church Fathers and biblical passages) to validate these ideas as part of the esoteric Christian tradition outside of the Gnostic schools, who were later considered heretical in the 3rd century.

See also

References

Further reading
 Anonymous [Valentin Tomberg] (1985). Meditations on the Tarot: A Journey Into Christian Hermeticism. New York, NY: Tarcher/Penguin. 
 Besant, Annie (2001). Esoteric Christianity or the Lesser Mysteries. City: Adamant Media Corporation. .
 Brown, Coleston (2007). Magical Christianity: The Power of Symbols for Spiritual Renewal.Wheaton, IL: Quest Books. 
 Duncan, Anthony (1972, 1996). The Lord of the Dance: An Essay in Mysticism. Sun Chalice Books. 
 Knight, Gareth (1975, 2010). Experience of the Inner Worlds. Cheltenham, Gloucestershire: Skylight Press. 
 Knight, Gareth (2011). A History of White Magic. Cheltenham, Gloucestershire: Skylight Press. 
 Powell, Robert. (2007). The Sophia Teachings: The Emergence of the Divine Feminine in Our Time. Aurora, CO: Lindisfarne Books. 
 Rittelmeyer, Friedrich (Author), Mitchell, M.L. (Translator) (2004). Meditation: Letters on the Guidance of the Inner Life 1932. Whitefish, MT: Kessinger Publishing, LLC. 
 Smoley, Richard (2002). Inner Christianity: A Guide to the Esoteric Tradition.Boston, MA: Shambhala Publications. 
 Steiner, Rudolf (1997). Christianity As Mystical Fact And The Mysteries Of Antiquity. Great Barrington, MA: Anthroposophic Press.

External links

 Esoteric/Mystic/Experiential Christianity
 The Cornerstone of Esoteric Christianity
 The Focus of Esoteric Futures
 The Esoteric Scribe
 Jacob Boehme Online

 
Christian mysticism